Fingerville is a Census-designated place located in Spartanburg County in the U.S. State of South Carolina. According to the 2010 United States Census, the population was 134.

History
A post office called Fingerville was established in 1845. The community was named for Joseph Finger, the owner of a cotton mill.

Geography
Fingerville is located at  (35.135077, -82.000409). These coordinates place the CDP in the Northern part of the county.

According to the United States Census Bureau, the CDP has a total land area of 0.244  square mile (0.393 km), all land.

Demographics

References

Census-designated places in Spartanburg County, South Carolina
Census-designated places in South Carolina